Theodore Aloysius Lapka (April 20, 1920 – December 1, 2011) was an American football end in the National Football League for the Washington Redskins. He was born in Hawthorne, Illinois. He attended DePaul University and St. Ambrose University  He had one receiving touchdown and missed the 1945 season while fighting in World War II..

References

Place of death missing
People from Cicero, Illinois
American football ends
United States Army Air Forces personnel of World War II
DePaul Blue Demons football players
St. Ambrose Fighting Bees football players
Washington Redskins players
1920 births
2011 deaths